Marcus H. Rosenmüller is a German film director and screenwriter.  He wrote and directed the films Grave Decisions,  and directed ,  and Beste Gegend.

Selected filmography
 Grave Decisions (2006)
  (2006)
  (2007)
  (2008)
  (2008)
  (2009)
  (2011)
  (2011)
  (2012)
  (2014)
 The Keeper (2018)

External links

1973 births
Best Director German Film Award winners
Film people from Bavaria
Living people
People from Miesbach (district)